Adventures in a TV Nation is a book by American author and film director Michael Moore and his producer and then-wife Kathleen Glynn.

It is a chronicle of Moore's series TV Nation, a 1994-95 newsmagazine show with humorous social commentary segments. In addition to covering the making of TV Nation and many of its segments, the book also discusses how Moore got a TV contract, the show's switch from NBC to the Fox network, and segments that never aired; it also includes an index of all the episodes.

The book was first published in paperback in 1998.

Chapters
 Introduction
 Who Let This Show On The Air
 Love Night
 Invading the Beach at Greenwich, Connecticut
 Payback Time
 The Corp-Aid Concert
 Crackers, the Corporate Crime-Fighting Chicken
 The CEO Challenge
 Brian Anthony Harris Is Not Wanted
 Taxi
 Slaves
 A Day with Dr. Death
 Are You Prepared for Prison?
 I Want to Be an Argentinian
 Junk Mail
 Sabotage
 Yuri, Our TV Nation Spy
 Mike Missile
 Haulin' Communism
 The Johns of Justice
 With Neighbours Like These
 Health Care Olympics
 Cobb County
 Making Peace with Pizza
 We Hire Our Own Lobbyist
 Whiny White Guys
 The Censored TV Nation
 When All Is Said and Done

References

Adventures in a TV Nation, Michael Moore and Kathleen Glynn, Perennial,

External links
 Adventures in a TV Nation, Chapter One

1998 non-fiction books
Books about television
Books by Michael Moore
Books about the United States
Books about politics of the United States
American non-fiction books